Orchid Island, also known by other names, is a  volcanic island off the southeastern coast of Taiwan Island. The island is part of Taiwan. It is separated from the Batanes of the Philippines by the Bashi Channel of the Luzon Strait.

Names 
Orchid Island is known by the Tao people indigenous to the island as Pongso no Tao ("island of human beings"). It was also known by the Tao as Ma'ataw ("floating in the sea") or Irala ("facing the mountain"); the latter being contrasted with the Tao name for the Taiwanese mainland - "Ilaod" ("toward the sea"). 

In the 17th century, it appeared on Japanese maps as "Tabako", a name borrowed into French and English as "Tabaco". Lesser Orchid Island was similarly known as "Little Botel-Tobago".

"Orchid Island" is a calque of the Chinese name, written  in traditional characters, although strictly the second character means an islet rather than an island. The name honors the local Phalaenopsis orchids and was established by the Republic of China government on 24 November 1946.

The island had previously been known to the Chinese as "Redhead Island" (Hung-t'ou Yü),  referring to the island's northwestern mountain peaks, which resemble red human heads when illuminated by the setting sun. These characters were borrowed into Japanese as Kōtōsho during their occupation of Taiwan.

History

Prehistory 
Based on genetic studies, Orchid Island was settled by the ancestors of the Tao people during the Austronesian Expansion (approximately 4000 BP) from the mainland of Taiwan. They maintained close contact through trade and intermarriage with the Ivatan people of the neighboring Batanes Islands of the Philippines until the beginning of the Colonial Era.

Qing Dynasty 
The island first appears on surviving charts in the 17th century, when it was noted by Japanese sailors.

In the early 1870s, William Campbell saw the island from aboard the Daphne, and wrote:

Imperial Japan 
During Japan's occupation of Taiwan, its government declared Kōtō Island an ethnological research area off-limits to the general public.

Republic of China 
After the Republic of China regained Taiwan, the island was administered as the Hong-tou-yu "township" of Taitung County after 19 January 1946 but the Japanese restrictions on visitors remained in effect. Because of these policies, the Tao continue to have the best-preserved traditions among the Taiwanese aborigines despite the end of the ban on settlement and tourism in 1967.

Since 1967, schools have been built on the island and education in Mandarin is compulsory.

Lesser Orchid Island has been used for target practice drills by the Republic of China Air Force.

A nuclear-waste storage facility was built in 1982 without prior consultation with the island's inhabitants. The plant receives nuclear waste from Taiwan's three nuclear power plants, all operated by the state utility Taipower. About 100,000 barrels of nuclear waste have been stored at the Lanyu complex. In 2002 and 2012, there were major protests from local residents, calling on Taipower to remove the waste from the island.

Geography 

The rock on the island is volcanic tholeiite andesite and explosive fragments. The volcano last erupted in the Miocene period. It is part of the Luzon Volcanic Arc. The andesite rock contains some visible crystals of pyroxene or amphibole. The geochemistry of the rock shows that it is enriched in sodium, magnesium, and nickel but depleted in iron, aluminum, potassium, titanium, and strontium.

As the island is within the tropics, the island experiences a warm and rainy tropical climate throughout the year with humidity often reaching more than 90%. Rainfall, abundant throughout the year, cools the temperature significantly.

Lesser Orchid Island is an uninhabited volcanic islet nearby. It is the southernmost point of Taitung County. It is home to a critically endangered endemic orchid, Phalaenopsis equestris f. aurea.

Forest Belle Rock is located south of Lesser Orchid Island.

<div style="width:100%;">

<div style="width:100%;">

Administrative divisions 

There are seven neighborhoods (社) in Lanyu Township, four of which are also administrative villages (村):

Flora and fauna 
Orchid Island hosts many tropical plant species, sharing many species with tropical Asia but also many endemics: there are 35 plant species found nowhere else. For example, Pinanga tashiroi is a species of palm tree found nowhere else than Orchid Island.

Green sea turtles make nests on the island, which is surrounded by coral reefs. Four species of sea snakes inhabit the waters around the island. Humpback whales were historically common in the area, and there were continuous sightings of them in the 2000s, which marked the first return of the species into Taiwanese waters since the cessation of whaling. Sightings are reported almost every year, although the whales do not stay for long, as they once did. They appear instead to be migratory visitors.

Demographics 
Out of a total current population of 5036, approximately 4200 belong to the indigenous Tao people and the remaining 800 are mainly Han Chinese.

Economy 

The islanders are mostly farmers and fishermen relying on a large annual catch of flying fish and on wet taro, yams, and millet.

On 19 September 2014, the first 7-Eleven store in the island was opened. During the opening ceremony, the township chief said that the store could provide conveniences to the local residents such as fee and tax collection.

Energy

Nuclear waste 

The Lanyu nuclear waste storage facility was built at the southern tip of Orchid Island in 1982. The plant receives nuclear waste from Taiwan's three nuclear power plants operated by state utility Taiwan Power Company (Taipower). Islanders did not have a say in the decision to locate the facility on the island.

In 2002, almost 2000 protesters, including many residents and elementary and high school students from the island, staged a sit-in in front of the storage plant, calling on Taipower to remove nuclear waste from the island. The government had pledged and then failed to withdraw the 100,000 barrels of waste from their island by the end of 2002. Aboriginal politicians successfully obstructed legislative proceedings that year to show support for the protests. In a bid to allay safety concerns, Taipower has pledged to repackage the waste since many of the iron barrels used for storage have become rusty from the island's salty and humid air. Taipower has for years been exploring ways to ship the nuclear waste overseas for final storage, but plans to store the waste in an abandoned North Korean coal mine have met with strong protests from neighboring South Korea and Japan due to safety and environmental concerns, while storage in Russia or China is complicated by political factors. Taipower is "trying to convince the islanders to extend the storage arrangement for another nine years in exchange for payment of NT$200 million (about $5.7 million)".

Following years of protests by residents, more concerns arose about the facility after Japan's Fukushima nuclear disaster in 2011. A report released in November 2011 said a radioactive leak had been detected outside the facility and this has added to residents’ concerns. In February 2012, hundreds of Tao living on Orchid Island held a protest outside the nuclear waste storage facility. Chang Hai-yu, a preacher at a local church, said "it was a tragedy that Tao children are being born into a radiation-filled environment". Lanyu mayor Chiang To-li "urged Taipower to remove nuclear waste from the island as soon as possible".

In March 2012, about 2,000 people staged an anti-nuclear protest in Taiwan's capital Taipei. Scores of aboriginal protesters "demanded the removal of 100,000 barrels of nuclear waste stored on Orchid Island, off south-eastern Taiwan. Authorities have failed to find a substitute storage site amid increased awareness of nuclear danger over the past decade".

Power generation 

The island houses its only power generation facility, the fuel-fired Lanyu Power Plant. Commissioned in 1982, the plant has a total installed capacity of 6.5 MW and is owned and operated by Taipower. Stipulated under Article 14 of the Offshore Islands Development Act, households on the island enjoy free electricity. The situation on the island resulted from the preferential policy given to the island residents due to the construction of the Lanyu Storage Site on the island in 1982.

Due to the free electricity, electricity consumption on the island is generally much higher than in other parts of Taiwan. In 2011, the average annual electricity consumption per household in Lanyu was 6,522 kWh, almost twice the 3,654 kWh Taiwan average. In 2002, Taipower provided an equivalent of NT$6.35 million worth of electricity to the island, and in 2011 the amount rose to NT$24.39 million. Due to this suspected abuse, members of Control Yuan called for an investigation into the electricity subsidy to Lanyu Island in 2012.

Tourist attractions 

 Lanyu Flying Fish Cultural Museum
 Lanyu Lighthouse
 Lanyu Weather Station

Transport 

The island is accessible by sea or air. Daily Air offers flights from Taitung Airport in Taitung City to Lanyu Airport on Orchid Island. The flight duration is half an hour and the daily frequency is dependent on weather conditions. Ferry trips to the island are available from Taitung City's Fugang Fishery Harbor year round. In the summer, there is a ferry from Houbihu port in Kenting.

Gallery

See also 
 Green Island – the other offshore township of Taitung County
 List of islands of Taiwan
 List of volcanoes in Taiwan

References

Citations

Bibliography 

 .

Further reading 
 
 Badaiwan de Shenhua 《八代灣的神話》 (Myths from Ba-dai Bay). Taipei: Morning Star Publishing Co., 1992.—Syaman Rapongan's first book; a collection of myths and his personal reflections on contemporary Tao; divided into two parts, with the first on myths, and the second on personal reflections.
 Lenghai Qing Shenhaiyang Chaosheng Zhe 《冷海情深—海洋朝聖者》(Deep Love for Cold Sea: The Oceanic Pilgrim). Taipei: Unitas Publishing Co., Ltd., 1997.—A collection of short stories about Syaman Rapongan's life on Lanyu; the book marks the writer's constant struggles with himself and his family because he voluntarily went unemployed and devoted himself solely to the ocean as a bare-hand diver in order to explore Tao civilization and find the meaning of life. The book also marks the writer's initial identity transition from a Sinicized man to a real Tao who embraces the value of physical labor and learns to cultivate the art of story-telling. The book was the Annual Reading for 1997 by United Daily News.
 Heise de Chibang 《黑色的翅膀》 (Black Wings). Taipei: Morning Star Publishing Co., 1999.—Syaman Rapongan's first novel; it questions the future of Tao people through the characterization of four young men (Kaswal, Gigimit, Jyavehai and Ngalolog) Should they run rigorously after the tempting ‘white body’ on the land or wait patiently for the arrival of ‘black wings’ on the sea? Although this appears a rhetorical question, Syaman Rapongan reveals that the conflicts are severe and their impact profound. This novel won Wu Zhuo-liou Literary Award in 1999.
 Hailang de Jiyi 《海浪的記憶》 (Memory of the Ocean Waves). Taipei: Unitas Publishing Co., Ltd., 2002.—Another collection of short stories; divided into two parts, with the first on the countless ties between Tao and the sea (six stories), and the second on Tao's staunch fights against foreign influences. Experimenting boldly with different genre and languages, the writer combines verses with prose and juxtaposes Tao and Chinese languages. As another Taiwanese writer and critic, Song Ze-lai, points out, Syaman Rapongan deliberately defamiliarizes his language and syntax in order to praise traditional Tao values and to guide his readers, especially Tao, back to the original way of living, far from influences of Chinese culture and modern civilization.
 Hanghaijia de Lian 《航海家的臉》 (The Face of a Navigator). Taipei: INK Literary Publishing Co., 2007.—Also a collection of articles; it continues the oceanic theme but exposes more of Syaman Rapongan's personal battles with modernity or traditionality and his pursuit of prosperity or return to innocence. Calling him-self a nomadic soul, Syaman Rapongan knows there may be no end to his battle. His course is a romantic one, without any definite plan. Nor will his beloved sea offer any answer or guidance. Nevertheless, consolation can be found in sweet solitude and family understanding. Syaman Rapongan's first attempt at trans-Pacific navigation with a Japanese captain and five Indonesian crew members is also included here.
 Lao Hairen 《老海人》 (Old Ama Divers). Taipei: INK Literary Publishing Co., Ltd., 2009.—Syaman Rapongan's second novel; highly praised and awarded (The Wu Lu-chin Prize for Essays, Chiu Ko Publishing Co. Annual Selection in 2006). Instead of following the previous semi-biographical direction, Syaman Rapongan focuses on three outcasts on his island, Ngalomirem, Tagangan and Zomagpit, whose pretty names fail to bring them pretty lives. Ngalomiren is regarded as a psychopath, Tagangan a miserable student though a brilliant octopus-catcher, and Zomagpit a hopeless drunkard. Through these figures, Syaman Rapongan portrays how Tao society stumbles between traditionality and modernity, and how broken the society has become in both material and mental terms as its humble and simple way becomes recognized again. In spite of a slight hope for reconciliation, this way back to the humble and simple Tao world is arduous, sometimes painful, and fully filled with regrets.

External links 

 Taiwan Aborigine Monograph Series 2
 Taipei Multicultural Arts Group
 Cultural Survival on Orchid Island
 Some information and pictures about the island
 Taipower, North Korea strike accord on nuke waste storage
 Orchid Island: Taiwan's nuclear dumpsite
 Syaman Rapongan, Taiwan's Ocean Literature Writer
 BBC News: Taiwan's paradise island fights to save its identity
 A subaqueous loner — Syaman Rapongan

Islands of Taiwan
Landforms of Taitung County
Lands inhabited by indigenous peoples
Miocene volcanoes
Subduction volcanoes
Volcanoes of Taiwan